The prime minister of Japan (Japanese: 内閣総理大臣, Hepburn: Naikaku Sōri-Daijin) is the head of government of Japan. The prime minister chairs the Cabinet of Japan and has the ability to select and dismiss its Ministers of State. The prime minister also serves as the commander-in-chief of the Japan Self Defence Forces and as a sitting member of the House of Representatives (the lower house). The individual is appointed by the Emperor of Japan after being nominated by the National Diet (the parliament). The prime minister must retain the nomination of the lower house and answer to parliament to remain in office. 

The position and nature of this title allow the holder to reside in and work at the Prime Minister's Official Residence in Nagatacho, Chiyoda, Tokyo, close to the National Diet Building. Fumio Kishida is the current prime minister of Japan, replacing Yoshihide Suga on 4 October 2021.

Designation

Abbreviations 
In Japanese, due to the special nature of the work of the head of government, the prime minister's titles vary depending on context, sometimes demonstrating his/her role. Since the inception of the cabinet system, the prime minister is known in Japanese as Naikaku Sōri-Daijin (内閣総理大臣) whenever he is referred to as the head of the Cabinet. However, this title is usually abbreviated to Sōri-Daijin (総理大臣). Other abbreviations include Sōri (総理), Shushō (首相) or even Saishō (宰相).

English notation 
The official English rendering is 'Prime Minister'. This English translation was informally used as the English translation of 'Grand Minister' before the introduction of the cabinet system. However, this was not the original English translation of 'Prime Minister', and a German translation, 'Minister President of the State', was also used in the past.

History 

Before the adoption of the Meiji Constitution, Japan had in practice no written constitution. Originally, a Chinese-inspired legal system known as ritsuryō was enacted in the late Asuka period and early Nara period. It described a government based on an elaborate and rational meritocratic bureaucracy, serving, in theory, under the ultimate authority of the emperor; although in practice, real power was often held elsewhere, such as in the hands of the Fujiwara clan, who intermarried with the imperial family in the Heian period, or by the ruling shōgun. Theoretically, the last ritsuryō code, the Yōrō Code enacted in 752, was still in force at the time of the Meiji Restoration.

The office was replaced in 1885 with the appointment of Itō Hirobumi to the new position of Minister President of State, four years before the enactment of the Meiji Constitution, which mentions neither the Cabinet nor the position of Prime Minister explicitly. It took its current form with the adoption of the Constitution of Japan in 1947.

To date, 64 people have served this position. The longest serving prime minister to date is Shinzo Abe, who served as prime minister in two terms: from 26 September 2006 until 26 September 2007, and from 26 December 2012 until 16 September 2020. Shinzo Abe was planning on running in the 2022 election but was assassinated on 8 July 2022 before the elections.

Appointment
The prime minister is nominated by both houses of the Diet, before the conduct of any other business. For that purpose, each conducts a ballot under the run-off system. If the two houses choose different individuals, then a joint committee of both houses is appointed to agree on a common nominee. Ultimately, however, if the two houses do not agree within ten days, the decision of the House of Representatives is deemed to be that of the Diet. Therefore, the House of Representatives can theoretically ensure the appointment of any prime minister it wants. The nominee is then presented with his or her commission, and formally appointed to office by the Emperor. 

Conventionally, the prime minister is almost always the leader of the majority party in the House of Representatives, or the leader of the senior partner in the governing coalition. But there have been three cabinet prime ministers from junior coalition partners (Ashida 1948, Hosokawa 1993, Murayama 1994), a few minority governments (most recently the Hata Cabinet in 1994 and at least numerically the Second Hashimoto Cabinet of 1996 during its first year, but with an extra-cabinet cooperation (閣外協力, kakugai kyōryoku) agreement with two parties, sufficient to ensure safe majorities for most government initiatives), and several cabinets with a majority in the House of Representatives, but without legislative majority of their own (most recently the DPJ-led cabinets after the 2010 election; cf. Nejire Kokkai/"twisted Diets").

Qualifications
 Must be a member of either house of the Diet. (This implies a minimum age of 25 and a Japanese nationality requirement.)
 Must be a civilian. This excludes serving members of the Japan Self-Defense Forces. Former military persons may be appointed, with Yasuhiro Nakasone being one prominent example.

Role

Constitutional roles
 Exercises "control and supervision" over the entire executive branch.
 Presents bills to the Diet on behalf of the Cabinet.
 Signs laws and Cabinet orders (along with other members of the Cabinet).
 Appoints all Cabinet ministers, and can dismiss them at any time.
 May permit legal action to be taken against Cabinet ministers.
 Must make reports on domestic and foreign relations to the Diet.
 Must report to the Diet upon demand to provide answers or explanations.
 May advise the Emperor to dissolve the Diet's House of Representatives.

Statutory roles
 Presides over meetings of the Cabinet.
 Commander-in-chief of the Japan Self-Defense Forces.
 May override a court injunction against an administrative act upon showing of cause.

Unlike most of his counterparts in constitutional monarchies, the prime minister is both de jure and de facto chief executive. In most other constitutional monarchies, the monarch is nominal chief executive, while being bound by convention to act on the advice of the cabinet. In contrast, the Constitution of Japan explicitly vests executive power in the Cabinet, of which the prime minister is the leader. His countersignature is required for all laws and Cabinet orders. While most ministers in parliamentary democracies have some freedom of action within the bounds of cabinet collective responsibility, the Japanese Cabinet is effectively an extension of the prime minister's authority.

Insignia

Official office and residence

The original Kantei served from 1929 until 2002, when a new building was inaugurated to serve as the current Kantei. The Kōtei lies to the southwest of the Kantei, and is linked by a walkway.

Travel 

The Prime Minister of Japan travels in a Toyota Century, which replaced the Lexus LS 600h L in 2019. 

For overseas air travel, the Japanese government maintains two Boeing 777, which replaced the Boeing 747-400 also in 2019. The aircraft is also used by the emperor, the members of the Imperial family, and other high-ranking officials. 

They have the radio callsigns Japanese Air Force One and Japanese Air Force Two when operating on official business, and Cygnus One and Cygnus Two when operating outside of official business (e.g., on training flights). The aircraft always fly together on government missions, with one serving as the primary transport and the other serving as a backup with maintenance personnel on board.

Honours and emoluments

Until the mid-1930s, the prime minister of Japan was normally granted a hereditary peerage (kazoku) prior to leaving office if he had not already been ennobled. Titles were usually bestowed in the ranks of count, viscount or baron, depending on the relative accomplishments and status of the prime minister. The two highest ranks, marquess and prince, were only bestowed upon highly distinguished statesmen, and were not granted to a prime minister after 1928. The last prime minister who was a peer was Baron Kijūrō Shidehara, who served as Prime Minister from October 1945 to May 1946. The peerage was abolished when the Constitution of Japan came into effect in May 1947.

Certain eminent prime ministers have been awarded the Order of the Chrysanthemum, typically in the degree of Grand Cordon. The highest honour in the Japanese honours system, the Collar of the Order of the Chrysanthemum, has only been conferred upon select prime ministers and eminent statesmen; the last such award to a living prime minister was to Saionji Kinmochi in 1928. More often, the Order of the Chrysanthemum has been a posthumous distinction; both the Collar and Grand Cordon of the order were last awarded posthumously to former prime minister Shinzo Abe in July 2022.

After relinquishing office, the prime minister is normally accorded the second or senior third rank in the court order of precedence, and is usually raised to the senior second rank posthumously. Certain distinguished prime ministers have been posthumously raised to the first rank; the last such award was to Eisaku Sato in 1975. Since the 1920s, following their tenure in office, Prime ministers have typically been conferred with the Grand Cordon of the Order of the Paulownia Flowers (until 2003 a special higher class of the Order of the Rising Sun), depending on tenure and eminence. However, honours may be withheld due to misconduct or refusal on the part of the prime minister (for example, Kiichi Miyazawa).

See also
List of prime ministers of Japan
List of spouses of prime ministers of Japan
Air transports of heads of state and government
Official state car
Japanese Air Force One

Notes

References

 Kenkyusha's New Japanese-English Dictionary, Kenkyusha Limited, Tokyo 1991,

External links

Prime Minister of Japan and His Cabinet Official website
List of Japanese cabinets 1885 to 1989　

Politics of Japan
 
1885 establishments in Japan